Patricio Lynch Island is an island in the Magallanes Region. It is named after Chilean navy officer Patricio Lynch.

External links
 UN islands watch

Campana Archipelago
Islands of Aysén Region